Since Michael Ziegler from the Conservatives became mayor following the 2005 election, he had held it.

In the 2017 election he would even lead his party to an absolute majority, with 12 seats. He would eventually become the mayor.

In this election, the Conservatives would lose a seat, but still have an absolute majority. Therefore, once again, Michael Ziegler was set to become mayor, and this would be his 4th term.

Electoral system
For elections to Danish municipalities, a number varying from 9 to 31 are chosen to be elected to the municipal council. The seats are then allocated using the D'Hondt method and a closed list proportional representation.
Høje-Taastrup Municipality had 21 seats in 2021

Unlike in Danish General Elections, in elections to municipal councils, electoral alliances are allowed.

Electoral alliances  

Electoral Alliance 1

Electoral Alliance 2

Electoral Alliance 3

Results

Notes

References 

Høje-Taastrup